Lake Noquebay is a large freshwater lake in northeastern Wisconsin. It is the largest lake in Marinette county.

Name 
Lake Noquebay was spelled Noque Bay or Nocque Bay in older sources. The name is believed to derive from Ojibwe noka or noke, meaning 'totem of the bear', and is likely a French interpretation to the names of Bay de Noc and the Noquet tribe. The implication of this naming would suggest that this area was important to the Noquet tribe's bear clan.

History 
The Lake Noquebay Wildlife area was acquired by the Wisconsin Department of Natural Resources (WDNR) in 1960 from Marinette county. The WDNR manages the wildlife and structures within this area. Changes include creation of two flowages and removal of a control structure.

Statistics
The nearest settlement to the lake is Crivitz  to the southwest. There are three other nearby towns: Wausaukee  to the north, and Pound  and Coleman  to the south-southwest. The lake has three small tributaries: Upper Inlet, Middle Inlet, and Lower Middle Inlet. Smith Creek is a tributary of Lower Middle Inlet.

Boating is accessible via four landings, including a fishing pier at the north access. The lake is historically noted for its large population of bluegills, making up approximately 70% of panfish. These bluegill are naturally maintained and require no intervention to sustain their size and abundance.

Water quality 
Lake Noquebay's average summer trophic level is 49, based on the measurements taken in the past five years with a Secchi disk. This is considered to be average for this type of lake. Historical data beginning in 1993 show a rise in trophic level that has not culminated in any significant shift. The coloration of the water is slightly opaque, indicating that it is slightly alkaline. Another indicator, total phosphorus, averaged  in summer, allowing for an insignificant but noticeable algal bloom. The Trophic state index measured suggests a mesotrophic lake, and all other data correlate with an average lake of this type. The littoral substrate is composed of 5% exposed gravel/rock, 25% muck, and 70% sand.

Climate 
Data from 1971 to 2000 have been collected showing average monthly high and low and temperatures along with average annual precipitation.

Fish 
A 2014 fish management report shows a sample of 8,941 fish representing 20 species and 1 hybrid in Lake Noquebay.

Aquatic plants 
There are about 32 aquatic plant species in Lake Noquebay according to a 2007 aquatic plant survey. The abundant plant species discovered at about 40% of the sample are bushy pondweed (Najas flexilis), variable-leaf watermilfoil (Myriophyllum heterophyllum), and muskgrass (Chara (alga) sp.) The aquatic species found at 18% of the sample include large-leaf pondweed (Potamogeton amplifolius), coontail (Ceratophyllum demersum), Illinois pondweed (Potamogeton illinoensis), variable-leaf pondweed (Potamogeton gramineus), and flat-stem pondweed (Potamogeton zosteriformis).

Attached to clam shells and attached to stems of variable-leaf milfoil are zebra mussels (Dreissena polymorpha) throughout the lake. In shallow water there are banded mystery snails (Viviparus georgianus), feeding on algae and detritus in sediment.

Maintenance 
A non-profit 501(c)(3) organization, the Lake Noquebay Anglers Partnership, is dedicated and committed to improving Lake Noquebay's public use by making improvement efforts toward fish population and habitat, water quality, public access (regular and handicap), and recreational use. Lake Noquebay's Anglers Partnership Inc. was created in November 2013. The organization stocked 7,000 yellow perch ranging from 5 to 7 inches in October 2019. As of February 2020, over 10,000 yellow perch have been stocked. The Wisconsin Walleye Initiative, overseen by Lake Noquebay's Anglers Partnership and Wisconsin DNR, stocked 12,000 walleye in September 2016 and 12,000 walleye in October 2018. Walleye stocked were 6 to 8 inches.
The funding provided to the Wisconsin Walleye Initiative is used in part with the Summer Tribal Youth Program, providing tribal youth opportunities to work with conservation projects such as the initiative.
Additionally, in 2015 a handicap accessible fishing pier was repaired on the north shore of the lake. This was funded by donations through these organizations. A Boat launch was promoted by the installation of a handicap accessible public pier in 2017. 
The non-profit organizations also created a man-made reef in March 2015, to promote walleye spawning.

Environmental concerns
Lake Noquebay is confirmed to contain the banded mystery snail, rusty crayfish, and zebra mussel in its waters as well as non-native phragmites in the surrounding grounds. In addition, Aquatic forget-me-not (Myosotis scorpioides) and Narrow-leaf cattail (Typha angustifolia) have been observed but not verified. 

Over 270 homes and four resorts are located on the shorelines of Lake Noquebay. Since 1975 the Lake Noquebay Rehabilitation District manages the plants, pollution run-off, and water quality of the lake. Their responsibilities also include the operations and maintenance of the dam. Their efforts have greatly reduced the phosphorus runoff from nearby farmlands. Historical data show that for several decades phosphorus levels have been increasing with an unknown cause. The aquatic ecosystems of northeast Wisconsin, phosphorus water levels average about 19 micrograms per liter. A nutrient study had been planned for 2018 by the Lake Rehabilitation District to measure the amounts of phosphorus entering the aquatic system and possibly locate the source. The study could take three years to complete and will be partly funded by Wisconsin DNR Lake Management Planning program grant. In June 2020, PFAS-contaminated biosolids were tested in water wells of nearby agricultural fields, which seem to be approaching Lake Noquebay. Four water wells in the area had samples reflecting detection levels above 20 parts per trillion of PFOA and/or PFOS. Two additional water wells had PFAS positive detections that show levels between reporting limit and 20 parts per trillion. Although, these were detected nearby, actual testing of Lake Noquebay was not determined at that time.

Recreation
Lake Noquebay is popular year round with boating, fishing, snowmobiling, water skiing. Lake Noquebay County Park lies on the south shore of the lake and includes picnic areas with grills, a playground, restrooms, a boat launch (with rentals), a sandy beach, and an indoor pavilion with changing booths for swimmers. The Crivitz Ski Cats Waterski Club performs weekly in the summer.

In addition, there is a 1,300-acre wildlife area, including a 662-acre sedge meadow officially designated as a natural area, on the east side of the lake. This area consists mostly of marshy, lowland vegetation with some cedars also present in the swamps. This area is popular for birding, fishing, hunting, trapping, wildlife viewing, and edible plant gathering. In addition, it is used for cross-country skiing, hiking, and snowmobiling, but there is only a defined trail for snowmobiling.

Wisconsin lakes are popular for ice fishing. Lake Noquebay's Fish-O-Rama has been a popular event, that has previously taken place in the brisk cold month of February. This ice fishing event has awarded cash prizes for the catch of the longest fish in seven fish categories. Double prizes have been given for the live release of fish catches.

References

Bodies of water of Marinette County, Wisconsin
Lakes of Marinette County, Wisconsin
Reservoirs in Wisconsin
Protected areas of Marinette County, Wisconsin